Brackendale is the name of two towns in Canada and Australia:

 Brackendale, British Columbia
 Brackendale, New South Wales